Viedma Lake is a Patagonian lake in the province of Santa Cruz, Argentina, situated near its border with Chile. Measuring approximately 50 miles (80 kilometers) in length, it is a major elongated trough lake formed from melting glacial ice. Viedma Lake is the second largest perennial lake located entirely within Argentina.

The name of the lake comes from the Spanish explorer Antonio de Viedma, who in 1783 reached its shores, being the first European to do so.

The town of El Chaltén and the Andes peaks Cerro Torre and Fitz-Roy lie in the proximity of Lake Viedma.

Lake Viedma is fed primarily by the Viedma Glacier at its western end. The Viedma Glacier measures 3 miles (5 kilometers) wide at its terminus at Lake Viedma. The brown landscape is a result of ice scouring, which left virtually no vegetation on the steep-walled valleys.

Water from lake Viedma flows into Lake Argentino through the La Leona River, and eventually from there into the Atlantic Ocean through the Santa Cruz River.

Although the lake lies in Argentine territory, the western shores of the lake reach the Southern Patagonian Ice Field in an area where the border remains undefined.

See also
 Lake San Martín
 Lake Argentino

References

Lakes of Santa Cruz Province, Argentina
Argentina–Chile border
Glacial lakes of Argentina
Lakes